{| class="sortable wikitable"
! Year !! Winner
|-
| 1900    || Boris Nikolaev
|-
| 1901    || Moishe Lowtzky 
|-
| 1902    || Fedor Duz-Khotimirsky
|-
| 1903    || Fedor Duz-Khotimirsky
|-
| 1904    || Fedor Duz-Khotimirsky 
|-
| 1905    || P.P. Benko
|-
| 1906    || Fedor Duz-Khotimirsky
|-
| 1908    || Stefan Izbinsky
|-
| 1909    || Boris Nikolaev
|-
| 1910    || Stefan Izbinsky
|-
| 1911    || Fedor Bogatyrchuk
|-
| 1913    || Alexander Evenson
|-
| 1914    || Alexander Evenson
|-
|}

References

Chess competitions
Chess in Ukraine
Sports competitions in Kyiv